The  (Flemish-Socialist Movement) is a left-wing nationalist political group that advocates Flemish independence. Founded in 2007, the organization traces its roots to a party with the same name that existed in the 1970s and 1980s. The organization "aims towards the creation of a socialist society with equal opportunities, rights and duties for all of its inhabitants in an independent Flanders, away from any antidemocratic and capitalist supranational structures, but in cooperation and solidarity with other freedom loving nations and states."

External links
 Their manifesto

Flemish political parties in Belgium
Nationalist parties in Belgium
Secessionist organizations in Europe
Socialist parties in Belgium
2007 establishments in Belgium
Political parties established in 2007
Left-wing nationalist parties